Carlos Ruiz Aranega (born 20 July 1983 in Baza, Granada, Andalusia) is a Spanish professional footballer who plays for CD Tenerife mainly as a defensive midfielder.

References

External links

1983 births
Living people
Spanish footballers
Footballers from Andalusia
Association football midfielders
Segunda División players
Segunda División B players
Tercera División players
CD Imperio de Albolote players
Granada CF footballers
UD Melilla footballers
SD Ponferradina players
CD Tenerife players